The 2011 King George VI and Queen Elizabeth Stakes was a horse race held at Ascot Racecourse on Saturday 23 July 2011. It was the 61st King George VI and Queen Elizabeth Stakes.

The winner was Lady Rothschild's Nathaniel, a three-year-old bay colt trained at Newmarket, Suffolk by John Gosden and ridden by William Buick. Nathaniel's victory was the first for his jockey, trainer and owner.

The race
Before the race, Nathaniel had contested five races, bypassing the Epsom Derby before recording his most important success when winning the Group Two King Edward VII Stakes at Royal Ascot in June. The 2011 King George VI and Queen Elizabeth Stakes attracted five runners, the smallest field since 1966, and Nathaniel was the only three-year-old to take part. The other contenders were Workforce (Epsom Derby, Prix de l'Arc de Triomphe), Rewilding (Dubai Sheema Classic, Prince of Wales's Stakes), St Nicholas Abbey (Racing Post Trophy, Coronation Cup) and Debussy (Arlington Million). Starting the 11/2 fourth choice in the betting, Nathaniel took an early lead before settling in second place behind Debussy. He moved up to regain the lead two furlongs from the finish at which point Rewilding fell heavily and was fatally injured. Workforce then emerged as Nathaniel's main challenger, but the Derby winner veered to the left in the closing stages and the three-year-old won by two and three-quarter lengths, with St Nicholas Abbey in third place.

Race details
 Sponsor: Betfair
 Purse: £1,033,263; First prize: £611,124
 Surface: Turf
 Going: Good to Soft
 Distance: 12 furlongs
 Number of runners: 5
 Winner's time: 2:35.07

Full result

 Abbreviations: nse = nose; nk = neck; shd = head; hd = head

Winner's details
Further details of the winner, Nathaniel
 Sex: Colt
 Foaled: 24 April 2008
 Country: Ireland
 Sire: Galileo; Dam: Magnificient Style (Silver Hawk)
 Owner: Lady Rothschild
 Breeder:  Kincorth Investments

References

King George
 2011
King George VI and Queen Elizabeth Stakes
King George VI and Queen Elizabeth Stakes
2010s in Berkshire